Bangura Gas Field is a natural gas field located in Comilla, Bangladesh. It is controlled by Bangladesh Petroleum Exploration and Production Company Limited (BAPEX).

Location
Bangura Gas Field is located in Muradnagar Upazila, Comilla district, Chittagong Division. It is located about 7 km away from the Srikail gas field and share the same landscape, and these two fields cover an area of 140 km2.

See also 
 List of natural gas fields in Bangladesh
 Bangladesh Gas Fields Company Limited
 Gas Transmission Company Limited

References

1996 establishments in Bangladesh
Natural gas fields in Bangladesh